Miroslav Sedlák (born 12 March 1993) is a Slovak footballer who plays for Spartak Trnava as a left back or winger.

FK DAC 1904 Dunajská Streda
He made his professional debut for FK DAC 1904 Dunajská Streda against ŠK Slovan Bratislava on 12 July 2013.

External links
Corgoň Liga profile
Eurofotbal profile

References

1993 births
Living people
Sportspeople from Senica
Slovak footballers
Association football defenders
FK Senica players
FC ŠTK 1914 Šamorín players
FC DAC 1904 Dunajská Streda players
FK Slovan Duslo Šaľa players
FC ViOn Zlaté Moravce players
Slovak Super Liga players